Sex Style is the second solo studio album by American rapper Kool Keith. It was released on February 3, 1997 via Funky Ass Records and was produced by KutMasta Kurt and Keith's Ultramagnetic MCs' bandmate T.R. Love. It is a dirty rap concept album utilizing a lyrical style Keith referred to as "pornocore". Although the album did not chart, it was reissued in 2006 with a bonus track "Get Off My Elevator", which was featured in 1999 film Office Space soundtrack.

Lyrics and music
Sex Style has been described as polarizing due to its lyrical style, which Kool Keith described as pornocore. The music was primarily written by producer Kutmasta Kurt. The production is noted for its deep, funky beats. Sex Style is described as a loose concept album.

The lyrics make frequent reference to sexual intercourse, with Kool Keith variously portraying himself as characters ranging from pimps to perverts. Keith also uses sexual metaphors to diss other rappers, many of which involve urolagnia.

Reception 

Allmusic reviewer Steve Huey wrote that Sex Style "is borderline necessary for Keith fans [...] it is a chance to hear one of the freakiest rappers of all time at his freakiest."

Track listing

Personnel
Keith Matthew Thornton — vocals, executive producer
Paul K. Laster — vocals (track 5)
Rex Colonel Doby Jr. — mini-moog (tracks: 6, 11)
Kurt Matlin — producer (tracks: 1–3, 5–8, 10, 11, 13–17)
 Trevor Randolph — producer (tracks: 4, 9, 12)
Daniel M. Nakamura — mixing & recording
Tom Baker — mastering
Jim Rasfeld — graphics

References

External links 

1997 albums
Concept albums
Kool Keith albums